Andrée "Dre" Vermeulen (born November 4, 1982) is an American actress who plays Dr. Monica Scholls in the TBS comedy series Angie Tribeca. She also voices the character Ruffnut in DreamWorks Dragons.

Vermeulen studied drama at Marymount Manhattan College and started her career with the Upright Citizens Brigade in 2008 in New York City and continued her work with them after her move to Los Angeles two years later. She is skilled at freestyle rapping in her UCB performances and cites Dana Carvey, Lil Wayne, and Q-Tip as influences. She credits her improv training for helping her get the role on Angie Tribeca, saying that understanding "the game of the scene" was essential to the Scholls character.

Personal life
Vermeulen grew up  in Stroudsburg, Pennsylvania with an American mother and a Belgian father who was concerned that she may become too Americanized.

In November 2019, she became engaged to Damien Cortese. In December, she announced that she was expecting a baby girl who was born in May 2020.

References

External links

1982 births
Living people
American television actresses
American voice actors
American sketch comedians
21st-century American comedians
21st-century American actresses
American people of Belgian descent
People from Long Branch, New Jersey